Serinda Swan (born July 11, 1984) is a Canadian actress best known for her work on television. In 2017, she starred in Marvel's Inhumans and HBO's Ballers, and also portrayed Anne Bancroft in the first season of Feud (2017). Previously, she guest starred on the WB/CW Superman prequel series Smallville as Zatanna Zatara, a DC Comics-inspired recurring character who is an actual magician. She also starred as Paige Arkin in the USA Network action drama series Graceland (2013–2015) and as Erica Reed in the A&E drama series Breakout Kings (2011–2012). She currently stars as Jenny Cooper in the CBC/CW crime drama series Coroner.

Early life
Swan was born in West Vancouver, British Columbia, Canada. Her father, Scott Swan, is a Canadian theatre director and actor who runs an acting studio.

Career
Her first acting job was in 1989, a small role in the Ted Danson and Isabella Rossellini film Cousins, when she was just five years old. One of her early on screen appearances as an adult was in Theory of a Deadman's music video for their single "So Happy", which was released in April 2008. Her first film credit was in 2009 in the romantic comedy The Break-Up Artist.

From 2009 to 2010, she appeared twice on The CW television series Smallville (in the season 8 episode "Hex" and season 9 episode "Warrior") as Zatanna Zatara. She also had the role of the Roman goddess, Veritas, in the season six episode "You Can't Handle the Truth" of Supernatural, another The CW series in 2010.

From 2011 to 2012, Swan starred as Erica Reed in the A&E television series, Breakout Kings. She shared that many of the prison scenes were shot in actual prisons, while real convicts are also there behind bars. The series was canceled on May 17, 2012.

Swan portrays Zera in the 2017 Brent Ryan Green film, The Veil. In March 2017, it was announced that Swan would portray Medusa in the ABC and Marvel Television series Inhumans. She starred on the series for one season, until 2018, when the series was canceled.

In late 2018, it was announced that Swan would star as the lead of CBC's forthcoming television series Coroner, based on the Jenny Cooper series of novels by M. R. Hall. The series premiered in January 2019 and attracted one million viewers per episode throughout the first season. In June 2020, it was announced that American network, The CW, Serinda's original home from when she was on Smallville, had picked up the show during COVID-19 pandemic due to the lockdowns of production sets on its other shows to fill primetime programming timeslots. The show premiered on August 5, 2020. And it attracted over 600,000 viewers approximately during each episode in the first season and grew more and more as the seasons continued for the network. As of October 2, 2022, Season 4 is currently airing. The series has completed 4 seasons. Release date for season 5 has not been announced yet. In June 2022, it was announced that Swan would be leaving the show, and would be potentially replaced by a new actress or actor with a new main character as the lead role. In September 2022, it was announced that she will be joining the cast for season 2 of the Amazon Prime Video series Reacher.

Activism
Swan works with several charities including the Somaly Mam Foundation, United Nations Foundation's Nothing But Nets, and Heifer International. She is a Founding Ambassador for Friends to Mankind, which describes itself as a non-profit organization that works "with individuals, corporations, and humanitarian organizations for the betterment of humanity".

Filmography

Film

Television

References

External links

 
 
 

1984 births
21st-century Canadian actresses
Actresses from British Columbia
Canadian film actresses
Canadian television actresses
Living people
People from West Vancouver